Timothy James Carrington Foster, MBE (born 19 January 1970) is an English rower who won a gold medal at the 2000 Summer Olympics in Sydney, Australia.

Career
He began rowing at Bedford Modern School and competed in the World Rowing Junior Championships in 1987 and 1988.<ref>School of the Black and Red, by Andrew Underwood, updated 2010</ref>  In the latter he competed in a pair with Matthew Pinsent. He became the first British rower to win gold medals at two consecutive Junior Worlds. From there he proceeded into the senior squad.

In 1993 he underwent back surgery but was straight back in the boat for the 1994 season, winning Bronze in the coxless four at the World Championships. This boat stayed together until the 1996 Olympics, where they won Bronze.

Following his Olympic medal, he continued his university studies at Oxford, competing in the 1997 Boat Race.

In 1997 he won a seat in the coxless four alongside Steve Redgrave, Matthew Pinsent and James Cracknell.  In the run up to the Olympics, he again needed back surgery and time off after severing tendons in his hand by punching a window at a boat club party. In August 2000, the month prior to winning gold in Sydney, a three-part BBC documentary entitled Gold Fever was broadcast. This followed the coxless four team in the years leading up to the Olympics, including video diaries recording the highs and lows in the quest for gold. Despite the problems Foster had had, he was in the final crew and they won the gold medal at the Sydney 2000 Olympics. He was awarded an MBE for his part in this in 2001.

After Sydney, he retired from international rowing, and retired as an active rower in July 2001. After a stint coaching at the University of London Boat Club, he joined the UK Sport-sponsored Elite Coach Programme in 2004. In January 2007, he became the head coach of the Swiss national rowing squad. He remained in this role until 2012, and now works as a business coach.

Personal life
At the 2008 Olympic Games in Beijing, Foster proposed to Joy Fahrenkrog, a four-time member of the United States Archery Team. The pair met in 2000 while Joy was studying at the London School of Economics and rowing for the University of London Boat Club. His brother Jason was the team manager for the England Rowing Team and head of rowing at George Watson's College, Edinburgh.

Achievements
 Olympic Medals: 1 Gold, 1 Bronze
 World Championship Medals: 2 Gold, 2 Silver, 3 Bronze
 Junior World Championship Medals: 2 Gold
 Blue Boat Appearances: 1 (0 wins)

Olympic Games
 2000: Gold, Coxless Four (with James Cracknell, Matthew Pinsent, Steve Redgrave)
 1996: Bronze, Coxless Four
 1992: 6th, Eight

World Championships
 1999: Silver, Eight
 1998: Gold, Coxless Four (with James Cracknell, Matthew Pinsent, Steve Redgrave)
 1997: Gold, Coxless Four (with James Cracknell, Matthew Pinsent, Steve Redgrave)
 1995: Silver, Coxless Four
 1994: Bronze, Coxless Four
 1993: Injured, did not compete in World Championships
 1991: Bronze, Eight
 1990: 4th, Coxless Four (with Martin Cross, Peter Mulkerrins, Gavin Stewart)
 1989 – Bronze, Eight

Junior World Championships
 1988: Gold, Coxless Pair (with Matthew Pinsent)
 1987: Gold, Coxless Four

Bibliography
 Four Men in a Boat'' (2004)

References

External links
 
 Gold Fever at bbc.co.uk

1970 births
Living people
English male rowers
Olympic rowers of Great Britain
Rowers at the 1992 Summer Olympics
Rowers at the 1996 Summer Olympics
Rowers at the 2000 Summer Olympics
English Olympic medallists
Olympic gold medallists for Great Britain
Olympic bronze medallists for Great Britain
Sportspeople from Bedford
People educated at Bedford Modern School
Alumni of St Cross College, Oxford
Alumni of Saïd Business School
Members of Leander Club
Members of the Order of the British Empire
Olympic medalists in rowing
Oxford University Boat Club rowers
World Rowing Championships medalists for Great Britain
Medalists at the 2000 Summer Olympics
Medalists at the 1996 Summer Olympics